The statue of Edmund Burke in Bristol, England, is a commemorative bronze sculpture of Edmund Burke (1729–1797) standing in The Centre, created in 1894 by James Havard Thomas. It is grade II listed.

Overview 
Standing in The Centre, Bristol, the statue is a commemorative bronze sculpture of Edmund Burke (1729–1797) by James Havard Thomas, created in 1894. It is grade II listed. A second copy of the sculpture stands on Massachusetts Avenue in Washington, D.C., United States. It has been said incorrectly that the statue is a copy of an 1858 marble work in the Palace of Westminster; that marble statue is by William Theed, the younger.

The bronze statue stands on a red granite plinth with the inscription "BURKE / 1774–1780 / I wish to be an MP to have my share of doing good and resisting evil / Speech at Bristol 1780". Burke was Member of Parliament for Bristol from 1774 to 1780.

The National Heritage List for England  record for the statue of Edward Colston which until June 2020 stood nearby gives as one of its reasons for listing the "Group value with other Bristol memorials: a statue of Edmund Burke, the Cenotaph, and a drinking fountain commemorating the Industrial and Fine Art Exhibition of 1893", referring to this statue, the Bristol Cenotaph and the 1893 Exhibition fountain.

References

1895 establishments in England
1895 sculptures
Bronze sculptures in England
Edmund Burke
Burke, Edward
Grade II listed buildings in Bristol
Outdoor sculptures in England
Burke, Edmund
Burke, Edmund